The Qatsi trilogy is the informal name given to a series of non-narrative films produced by Godfrey Reggio and scored by Philip Glass:

 Koyaanisqatsi: Life Out of Balance (1982)
 Powaqqatsi: Life in Transformation (1988)
 Naqoyqatsi: Life as War (2002)

The titles of all three motion pictures are words from the Hopi language, in which the word qatsi translates to "life." The series was produced by the Institute For Regional Education, who also created the Fund For Change.

Legacy
Many of director Godfrey Reggio's other motion-pictures use  cinematic techniques and stylistic elements he first explored in the Qatsi trilogy.

The cinematic films of Koyaanisqatsi cinematographer Ron Fricke—Chronos (1985), Baraka (1992), and Samsara (2011)—are also made in a similar style.

See also 
 Man with a Movie Camera (1929), a Soviet Ukrainian silent motion-picture whose themes and editing resemble those seen in the Qatsi trilogy.

References

External links
Koyaanisqatsi.org: the official Qatsi trilogy page

Avant-garde and experimental film series
Films about Native Americans
Trilogies